Minye Thihathu II of Toungoo (c. 6 August 1550 – 11 August 1609) was king of the breakaway kingdom of Toungoo (Taungoo) from 1597 to 1609. His kingdom was one of several small states that emerged following the collapse of Toungoo Empire. He is best known in Burmese history for his role in the sack of Pegu (Bago) in 1599 that ended the Toungoo Empire.

He was viceroy of Toungoo from 1584 to 1597 during the reign of his first cousin King Nanda. After breaking away, he entered into an alliance with King Raza II of Arakan, and they captured Pegu in December 1599. The allies thoroughly looted the city before burning it down two months later. They also drove back a Siamese invasion, and agreed to jointly administer Lower Burma outside of Siamese-controlled Martaban (Mottama). But they lost control of Lower Burma in 1603 when the Portuguese governor of Syriam (Thanlyin) in the service of Arakan switched sides to Portuguese Goa. The allies' attempt to regain Syriam in 1603–04 failed.

He spent his last years rebuilding the city of Toungoo and other war ravaged regions around his kingdom. But he also saw his kingdom increasingly boxed in by the Portuguese from the south and Ava (Inwa) from the north. He died a year before Ava took over Toungoo.

Background
Minye Thihathu was the eldest child of Viceroy Minkhaung II of Toungoo and his chief consort Laygyun Mibaya, and was born in Toungoo (Taungoo) c. 6 August 1550. His father was a half brother of King Bayinnaung of the Toungoo dynasty. His mother was a daughter of King Bayin Htwe of Prome (Pyay), and great-granddaughter of King Narapati of Ava. He was born during his father brief insurrection against Bayinnaung, following the assassination of King Tabinshwehti. He had four full siblings (a brother and three sisters) and a half-sister.

Early career

Governor of Tharrawaddy (c. 1564–74)
Although chronicles provide no details on his early life, the young prince apparently made an impression on his uncle the king. When he was about 14, he was appointed governor of Tharrawaddy (Thayawadi), a small town in present-day Bago Region, with the style of Minye Kyawhtin. In October 1564, the king gave his 14-year-old nephew the command of the 12,000-man Fifth Army for the upcoming Lan Na and Lan Xang campaigns. While it was not unusual that a young Burmese prince was asked to go to the front, it was uncommon that the 14-year-old was given such a high position. Five other army commanders of the 64,000-strong invasion force were the king, the crown prince, his father, and his two other uncles, all of whom were at least a generation older, and had plenty of military experience. To be sure, he was there to represent the high king in an army largely consisted of Siamese regiments. In fact, his Siamese "deputies" all had prior military experience.

His army participated in the capture of Vientiane in January 1565, and spent months trekking the Laotian hills in their fruitless pursuit of King Setthathirat of Lan Xang. He had already turned 15 when he arrived back at Pegu (Bago) in October 1565. In October 1568, he was again called to lead the 5000-strong Fifth Army, made up of troops from Lan Na and Kengtung, to put down rebellions in southern Siam and Lan Xang. Southern Siam's rebellion was put down in August 1569 but Lan Xang remained at large. Like in 1565, his army participated in the 1569 invasion of Lan Xang.

At age 20, he was married to his half-cousin Min Khin Saw, daughter of Bayinnaung by Queen Sanda Dewi on 1 May 1571.

Heir-apparent of Toungoo (1574–84)
In 1574, he returned to his native Toungoo, and became the heir-apparent there. He participated in two more military campaigns in the remaining years of Bayinnaung. He led an army in the 1575–76 campaign against a rebellion in the northern Shan states of Mohnyin and Mogaung. He was the co-commander-in-chief of the Arakan campaign in 1581. But his armies saw little action as the campaign was called off soon after King Bayinnaung's death in October 1581 by the new king Nanda.

He returned to a deceptively calm country, which then was "probably the largest empire in the history of Southeast Asia" and an "absurdly overextended empire". The transfer of power had gone smoothly; all key major vassal rulers, who ruled what until recently used to be sovereign kingdoms, initially pledged allegiance to the new king, while adopting a wait-and-see attitude. For his part, Nanda did not trust his vassals especially his own kinsmen Minkhaung II of Toungoo and Thado Minsaw of Ava. When Thado Minsaw revolted in 1583–84, Minkhaung sided with Nanda, who suppressed the rebellion in April 1584.

Viceroy of Toungoo (1584–97)

Nominal vassal
Minkhaung's support of Nanda was crucial in his son succeeding him as viceroy. Less than two months after the Ava campaign, in June 1584, Minkhaung died. Nanda agreed to Minye Kyawhtin's accession, granting him the title Minye Thihathu, King of Toungoo, the same style used by their grandfather Mingyi Swe. For his part, Minye Thihathu II pledged loyalty to his half-cousin, and brother-in-law.

However, he and other vassal rulers were only nominally loyal to the high king. They used Nanda's preoccupation with Siam, which revolted in May 1584, to gain greater autonomy for themselves, only contributing nominally to the war effort. In all, Minye Thihathu went to the front only in the 1586–87 invasion of Siam, contributing just two regiments (2000 men). He sent a single regiment each in the 1590–91 and 1592–93 invasions. He provided no support in suppressing the 1590–92 rebellion in Mogaung (present-day Kachin State).

In defense of Lower Burma (1594–95)
The period of relative autonomy ended in 1593. By then, all five invasions of Siam (1584–93) had ended in failure, and Nanda had finally given up on winning back Siam. He now turned his attention to reasserting his authority closer to home. Minye Thihathu had to pay attention because Toungoo was surrounded on three sides by the states ruled by Nanda and his sons (Ava in the north, Prome in the west and Pegu in the south). When Nanda asked him to lead an army to put down a Siam-backed rebellion in Moulmein (Mawlamyaing) in October 1594, he agreed. But his 8,000-man army was badly defeated outside Moulmein by the Siamese army. At Pegu, Minye Thihathu was severely reprimanded by Nanda, before being allowed to return to Toungoo.

But he was soon asked for help again by Nanda. In December 1594, a 12,000-strong Siamese army led by King Naresuan laid siege to Pegu. Nanda had not expected an invasion of Pegu itself, and in desperation asked Prome, Toungoo and Lan Na for help. Minye Thihathu was in no hurry. Since he could not break the siege on his own in any case, he reinforced his city's defenses while he waited for the troops from Lan Na to arrive. It was only in March that he left with his army alongside Lan Na troops for Pegu. He left his eldest son Natshinnaung in charge of the fortified city.

Meanwhile, Prome forces led by Thado Dhamma Yaza III of Prome, instead of breaking the siege at Pegu, revolted against his father Nanda, and marched to Toungoo in a brazen attempt to consolidate central Burma. The Prome army laid siege to Toungoo for two weeks, and retreated only after Minye Thihathu rushed back with his army.

Break from Pegu
By then, everyone was out entirely for himself. Prome had taken over western central Burma up to Pakhan in the north. After the close call, Minye Thihathu decided to defend his own turf, and not help Nanda. Other vassals came to the same conclusion. Then in 1597 Nanda ordered that the rulers of Toungoo, Lan Na and Upper Burma send their first born sons to Pegu, essentially to be kept as hostages. They all refused. Minye Thihathu and Nawrahta Minsaw both formally renounced all tributary ties to Nanda. Others like Nyaungyan of Upper Burma and Vorapita of Lan Xang may not have formally declared independence but they essentially broke away as well.

King of Toungoo (1597–1609)

Conquest of Pegu (1598–99)

Nanda was in a free fall. Over the next year, his power further deteriorated in the two remaining regions he still ruled: the Pegu province and the Irrawaddy delta. Most able bodied men had fled elsewhere. Minye Thihathu eyed Pegu for the city's enormous riches as well as access to maritime trade of Lower Burma. He entered into an alliance with King Raza II of Arakan. The allies agreed to a joint attack on whatever remained of the empire, and share the spoils. He chose Arakan, the farthest kingdom, figuring that after getting their share of the loot, the Arakanese would return home and not be a rival for Lower Burma.

In March 1598, Minye Thihathu moved deep into Pegu's territory, posting a 5000-man army at Kawliya, 60 km northeast of Pegu. On , 30,000-strong Arakanese land and naval forces left Mrauk-U for Lower Burma. The Arakanese navy seized the main port city of Syriam (Thanlyin) in March 1599. In April, the allies laid siege to Pegu. About nine months into the siege, Nanda's heir-apparent Minye Kyawswa defected on a promise of good treatment but was promptly executed. The fallen king and his family were sent to Toungoo.

The victors divided the enormous wealth of Pegu, accumulated over the past 60 years as the capital of Toungoo Empire. The gold, silver and precious stones were equally divided. The Arakanese share included several brazen cannon, 30 Khmer bronze statues, and a white elephant. Toungoo got the Tooth relic and Alms Bowl of Ceylon and other sacred religious artifacts. Toungoo's share of the loot alone totaled more than a dozen caravans, each consisting of 700 elephants and horses. Meanwhile, they received the news that King Naresuan and his army were marching toward Lower Burma. While he planned to hold Lower Burma, Minye Thihathu's first priority was to get the loot to the secure confines of Toungoo. On , he and his army returned with their loot to Toungoo, leaving the Arakanese in charge of the city. The Arakanese army methodically stripped the palace and the city of whatever remaining treasures, and set fire to the city. The Kanbawzathadi Palace and the city of Pegu, rebuilt by Bayinnaung in 1565–68 was burned down. The Arakanese then left for Syriam, and shipped the loot off to Mrauk-U. The Toungoo Empire, "the most adventurous and militarily successful in the country's history", ceased to exist.

Without realizing that the Arakanese forces were still in Syriam to the south, he marched north.

Siamese invasion of Lower Burma (1600)

Naresuan and the Siamese army arrived a few weeks later, and laid siege to the city. The Siamese troops tried to drain the city's moats by building a channel to the Paunglaung river. But the ambitious plan was cut short when their supplies stopped coming. The Arakanese forces, which Naresuan had not counted on remaining in Lower Burma, had been cutting off Siamese supply lines, and had returned to Pegu. But he had to go through a gauntlet of Arakanese ambushes, and took heavy losses before reaching the border. Still, Nareusan had successfully extended his control to the entire Tenasserim coast to Martaban (Mottama).

Sharing control of Lower Burma with Arakan
With the Siamese threat still so close, Minye Thihathu agreed to holding Lower Burma together with Arakan. He may not have had a choice in the matter especially since it was the Arakanese that primarily defeated the Siamese invasion. In a key concession, he agreed to Arakanese control of Syriam, the main port of Lower Burma in exchange for a share of the tax revenue from the port. In June 1600, King Raza appointed a Portuguese captain named Filipe de Brito e Nicote in his service as governor, and left a garrison consisted mainly of foreign mercenaries.

Despite his dependence on Syriam's revenues, Minye Thihathu did nothing when other rulers tried to take over the port. In 1601, the Syriam garrison repulsed two separate attacks by Yan Naing, the lord of Prome, and Binnya Law, a Mon lord. Later in the year, the garrison came under siege by Binnya Dala, the Siamese appointed viceroy of Martaban, for seven months until May 1602. Binnya Dala then made peace with De Brito in a marriage of alliance between his daughter and De Brito's son Simon. All the while, Minye Thihathu kept a series of garrisons near Syriam and Martaban to prevent the warfare from spilling over but nothing else. By then, even the authority of the Arakanese king over the Portuguese led garrison was nominal. De Brito had been in contact with Aires de Saldanha, Viceroy of Goa, to make Syriam a Portuguese colony.

Coronation
On , Minye Thihathu was crowned king with the title of Maha Dhamma Yaza while his chief queen took the title of Atula Agga Maha Dewi. His eldest son Natshinnaung was made heir-apparent. He also give his eldest younger brother the title Thado Dhamma Yaza, the style of rulers of Prome, indicating that he had designs on Prome, the kingdom to his west.

Loss of Lower Burma ports

His designs on Prome would have to wait. C. March/April 1603, the Portuguese at Syriam declared their allegiance to the Portuguese Empire, and renounced ties to both Arakan and Toungoo.

In response, Toungoo and Arakan launched a joint attack on Syriam in the dry season of 1603–04. Minye Thihathu himself led the Toungoo army. But the Arakanese navy, consisted of a hundred ships and over a hundred war boats, was defeated by a few Portuguese warships near Cape Negrais, and their commander Crown Prince Min Khamaung was captured. The Arakanese king himself followed up with another 300-boat navy, and with the Toungoo forces jointly laid siege to the city. But Syriam defenses held. In the following negotiations, in 1604, the Arakanese agreed to a ransom of 50,000 ducats for the release of the crown prince, and to Syriam's status as a Portuguese colony.

Final years (1604–09)
In his last years, Minye Thihathu saw his kingdom increasingly squeezed by a resurgent Ava and a powerful Portuguese Syriam. The Portuguese takeover of Syriam (along with the Arakanese withdrawal) essentially ended Toungoo's hold over Lower Burma. In the following years, the Portuguese projected their power throughout the delta, and gained the allegiance of delta lords. Toungoo's borders were pushed back to Pegu, and the kingdom was now completely landlocked. The loss of maritime trade and revenue from the seaports adversely affected Toungoo's economy. In later years, even the Pegu border was routinely breached by the Portuguese. Chronicles state that Minye Thihathu's troops were powerless to stop the Portuguese looting the relic chambers of the Buddhist pagodas around Pegu.

Meanwhile in the north, King Anaukpetlun, following the work begun by his father King Nyaungyan, had reunified Upper Burma and cis-Salween Shan States by 1606, and captured Prome in 1608.

Toungoo was next. But Minye Thihathu did not live to see the showdown. He was succeeded by Natshinnaung.

Administration
After the Siamese invasion, he launched a major construction works program to rebuild the city of Toungoo and war ravaged areas around the city. He resettled people into his rebuilt city. The present-day quarters of Yodaya Dan ("Siamese Quarter"), Pabedan ("Blacksmith Quarter"), "Taik Tan" (formerly, Kye-Taik Tan, "Revenue Building Quarter") date from his time.

List of military campaigns

Notes

References

Bibliography
 
 
 
 
 
 
 
 
 
 
 
 
 
 

Rulers of Toungoo
1550 births
1609 deaths